IARC may refer to:
 International Aerial Robotics Competition
 International Age Rating Coalition
 International Agency for Research on Cancer
 International Arctic Research Center
 Israel Amateur Radio Club
 iArc, South Korean architecture firm